Universidade Veiga de Almeida (Veiga de Almeida University, often abbreviated as UVA) is a private university with campuses located in Rio de Janeiro and Cabo Frio, Brazil.

History
It was first founded in 1972 by Professor Mario Veiga de Almeida as the Escola de Engenharia Veiga de Almeida (Veiga de Almeida School of Engineering). It gained university status in 1992. The university was acquired by Rede Ilumno in 2011. Since then standards have consistently increased.

References

External links
 Official website

 
1972 establishments in Brazil
Educational institutions established in 1972
Universities and colleges in Rio de Janeiro (city)
Universities and colleges in Rio de Janeiro (state)